Pirimelinae is a subfamily of crabs belonging to the family Carcinidae in the order Decapoda. It previously was treated as a family.

Genera

Extant genera:

 Pirimela Leach, 1816
 Sirpus Gordon, 1953

Extinct genera:

 Parapirimela Van Straelen, 1937
 Pliopirimela Van Bakel, Jagt, Fraaije & Willie, 2003
 Trachypirimela Müller, 1974

References

Decapods
Decapod families